A salty dog is a cocktail of gin, or vodka, and grapefruit juice, served in a highball glass with a salted rim. The salt is the only difference between a salty dog and a greyhound. Historically a gin drink, it is believed to date back to the 1920s.

The drink is 2 fluid ounces of gin, or vodka, mixed with fresh grapefruit juice, shaken, and poured into a glass whose rim has been salted.

In popular culture

The salty dog is a favorite drink of Artie (the producer played by Rip Torn) on the sitcom The Larry Sanders Show.

See also
 List of cocktails

References

Cocktails with gin
Cocktails served with a salty rim
Cocktails with grapefruit juice